In the Catholic Church, the Synod of Bishops, considered as an advisory body for the pope, is one of the ways in which the bishops render cooperative assistance to him in exercising his office. It is described in the 1983 Code of Canon Law as "a group of bishops who have been chosen from different regions of the world and meet at fixed times to foster closer unity between the Roman Pontiff and bishops, to assist the Roman Pontiff with their counsel in the preservation and growth of faith and morals and in the observance and strengthening of ecclesiastical discipline, and to consider questions pertaining to the activity of the Church in the world."

In addition, each patriarchal church and each major archiepiscopal church within the Catholic Church has its own synod of bishops. Unlike the body that normally assists the pope only by offering advice, these synods of bishops are competent, and exclusively so, to make laws for the entire sui iuris church that each governs. The Code of Canons of the Eastern Churches makes mention 115 times of the "synod of bishops" in this sense and only once (canon 46) mentions the synod of bishops that the pope convokes.

These synods of bishops are not what in Eastern Orthodox and Oriental Orthodox Churches are called Holy Synods. The latter concept corresponds instead to that of the standing synod of these Catholic synods of bishops, which consists of the patriarch or major archbishop and four bishops appointed for a five-year term. Of the four, three are elected by the church's synod of bishops and one is appointed by the patriarch or major archbishop, while another four are designated in the same way to replace any member who is impeded. A meeting of a whole synod of bishops is called when a decision is required on a question that only the synod of bishops is authorized to decide, or when the patriarch or major archbishop, with the agreement of the standing synod, judges it to be necessary, or when at least one third of the bishops request that it be held to consider some specific matter. In addition, the individual canon law of some patriarchal and major archiepiscopal churches requires that the synod of bishops be convoked at predetermined intervals.

The papal Synod of Bishops is permanent, even when not in session. Periodically, it holds assemblies, which are either general, if called to consider matters directly concerning the universal Church, or special, if called for problems of a particular geographical area.  The general assemblies are either ordinary (held at fixed intervals) or extraordinary (held to treat of some urgent matter).

The papal Synod of Bishops also has a permanent secretariat headquartered in Rome but not part of the Roman Curia. Pope Francis greatly increased both the authority and influence of the Synod in September 2018.

Establishment and nature
In 1959, three years before the Second Vatican Council began, Cardinal Silvio Oddi proposed a permanent consultative body of bishops drawn from many parts of the world to discuss major concerns of the Church, and Cardinal Bernardus Johannes Alfrink proposed a permanent council of specialized bishops to legislate for the Church in union with the Pope and the cardinals.

Within the framework of the Council itself, the first to put forward "the idea of a 'permanent synod of bishops' surrounding the pope" was Melkite Patriarch Maximos IV. In 1963, during the third session of the Council, he proposed that "a relatively small group of bishops [...] with rotating membership would always be in session in Rome to assist the pope. They would work with the pope in collegial fashion".  The model he proposed was what the 1990 Code of Canons of the Eastern Churches was to call the synod of bishops, but that he himself called the holy synod of his sui iuris church, a collegial body comprising both the patriarch and other bishops.

On 14 September 1965, at the opening of the fourth and final session of the Council, Pope Paul VI announced that on the following day he was to establish the Synod of Bishops in a form that "could hardly have been further from what Maximos had proposed in the previous year". He noted that "the Ecumenical Council ... gave Us the idea of permanently establishing a special Council of bishops, with the aim of providing for a continuance after the Council of the great abundance of benefits that We have been so happy to see flow to the Christian people during the time of the Council as a result of Our close collaboration with the bishops." The Pope sought "to make ever greater use of the bishops' assistance in providing for the good of the universal Church" and to enjoy "the consolation of their presence, the help of their wisdom and experience, the support of their counsel, and the voice of their authority." This preempted action by the Council, and made the Synod "immediately and directly" subject to papal authority, ensuring that it would be strictly an advisory body. The Synod of the Bishops does not constitute collegial governance of the Church, but represents a collaboration with the Pope: it discusses topics proposed to it and makes recommendations, but does not settle questions or issue decrees, unless the Pope grants it deliberative power in certain cases.

Collegial governance under Pope Francis

From the beginning of his papacy, Pope Francis expressed his desire to strengthen the collegial aspects of the Church's governance, and he argued for more recognition of charismatic gifts in the Church. He has held major synods on the topics of the family (2014), on youth (2018), and on the Church in the Pan-Amazon region (2019). On September 15, 2018, Francis approved the new apostolic constitution Episcopalis communio (Episcopal Communion). The constitution states that the Synod's final document, if approved by the members with "moral unanimity" and, if the Pope has "granted deliberative power to the Synod Assembly", it becomes part of the Ordinary Magisterium of Catholic teaching "once it has been ratified and promulgated by him". The new constitution also provides for the laity to send their contributions directly to the synod's secretary general. Some analysts surmise that the greatest achievement of Francis' papacy may be his creation of a more synodal Catholic church, where synods serve as a platform for open and energetic debate.

On 6 February 2021, Pope Francis appointed Nathalie Becquart an undersecretary of the Synod of Bishops, making her the first woman to have the right to vote in the Synod of Bishops.

Secretariat and Council
The Synod of the Bishops has its own permanent general secretariat, composed of the General Secretary and a fifteen-member council, twelve of whom are elected by each general assembly and three are appointed by the Pope. The secretariat assists in preparing the apostolic exhortation which the Pope publishes on the basis of the recommendations of each general assembly, and it prepares the next assembly. Their function ceases with the start of a new general assembly. A similar function is performed by specific special councils elected by the special assemblies.

Secretaries-General of the Synod of Bishops
Wladyslaw Rubin (27 February 1967 – 12 July 1979)
Jozef Tomko (12 July 1979 – 24 April 1985)
Jan Pieter Schotte, C.I.C.M. (24 April 1985 – 11 February 2004)
Nikola Eterović (11 February 2004 – 21 September 2013)
Lorenzo Baldisseri (21 September 2013  – 15 September 2020)
Mario Grech (15 September 2020 – present)

Powers of the pope
The pope convokes the Synod of Bishops; ratifies the election of participants; determines the topic of discussion; distributes the material for discussion; sets the agenda; and presides either personally or through delegates.

The pope may also appoint participants of his own choosing, their number limited to 15% of the other delegates who participate either ex officio or as elected representatives of episcopal conferences or the Union of Superiors General.

Assemblies
The procedures followed at assemblies of the Synod of the Bishops are indicated in the Order of the Synod of Bishops, originally issued in 1969, the latest revision of which was published on 29 September 2006.

Ordinary general assemblies
In preparation for each ordinary general assembly, episcopal conferences are asked to suggest up to three themes for discussion. After the secretariat has studied those proposals, the Pope, generally on the basis of the secretariat's recommendation, establishes the topic and agenda of the assembly. Criteria for the choice of the topic are: 1) that it be of universal, not merely regional, interest; 2) that it be pastoral in character with a firm doctrinal base; 3) that it be contemporary and urgent enough to stir up "new energies and movements in the church towards growth"; 4) that it can be addressed within the allotted time.

Most participants in the assembly, called Synodal fathers, are elected by the bishops' conferences: one in the case of a conference with no more than 25 members, two if a conference has up to 50 members, three from a conference with up to 100 members, and four from a larger conference.  Other representative participants include heads of Eastern Catholic Churches, ten members of religious institutes elected by the Union of Superiors General, and the cardinals who head the Roman Congregations and some other departments of the Roman Curia. Dozens more participate by virtue of synodal functions assigned by the Holy See or as papal appointees, mostly cardinals and other curiate or diocesan prelates.

Fraternal delegates from several Orthodox and Protestant churches (7 each in 2015) have observer status.

The secretariat, which includes various other clerical and lay experts, prepares a preliminary outline document (Lineamenta) which is distributed to all concerned for comment. Based on this feedback, a working document (instrumentum laboris) is prepared and distributed to all churches. This document is the basis for discussions at the synod. The assembly examines proposals (propositiones) put forward by its members and passes to the Pope those that receive the assembly's approval. The Pope uses these as the basis for a papal post-synodal apostolic exhortation.

The first general assemblies attempted to draw up their own concluding documents, but found that the time available was insufficient for doing so properly.

Extraordinary general assemblies
In view of the greater urgency that justify their convocation, the preparation of extraordinary general assemblies of the Synod of the Bishops is shorter. The participants also are fewer, consisting of the heads of Eastern Catholic Churches, the presidents (only) of episcopal conferences, three members (not ten) of religious institutes and the cardinals who head dicasteries of the Roman Curia.

, there have been three such assemblies, in 1969, 1985, and 2014. The 1985 assembly commemorated the twentieth anniversary of the conclusion of the Second Vatican Council.

Special assemblies
Special assemblies of the Synod of the Bishops are limited to a certain geographical area, a country, region, or continent. Their participants, chosen in line with the rules for extraordinary general assemblies, are limited to those directly involved in that geographical area.

Special assemblies have been held for Africa (twice), America, Asia, Europe (twice), Oceania, the Middle East, Lebanon, and the Netherlands. Another is planned for the Amazon region.

Chronology
The Synod of the Bishops has held the following assemblies:

Ordinary General

Extraordinary General

Special

See also
Collegiality (Catholic Church)
College of Bishops
Synodality
Synod

Notes

References

Citations

Sources

 .
 .
 .
 

Synod of bishops in the Catholic Church
20th-century Catholicism
21st-century Catholicism
Catholic canonical structures